may refer to:

Places
Hikari Station, a station on Sanyō Main Line in Hikari, Yamaguchi
Hikari, Chiba, a former town in Sousa District, Chiba, Japan
Hikari, Yamaguchi, a city in Yamaguchi Prefecture, Japan

People
Hikari (name), people and characters with the name

Film and TV
Radiance (2017 film), original title Hikari
Hikari TV, IPTV provider and production company

Music
Hikari (Maaya Uchida album) 
Hikari (Oceans Ate Alaska album), or the title song by Oceans Ate Alaska, 2017
"Hikari" (Mai Hoshimura song), a 2008 song by Mai Hoshimura
"Hikari" (Hikaru Utada song), a 2001 song by Hikaru Utada
"Hikari", a 2006 song by Yui Horie
"Hikari", a 2012 song by BT from If the Stars Are Eternal So Are You and I
"Hikari" (Pentagon song), a 2017 song by Pentagon

Other uses
Hikari (company), a brand of flake-style fish food
Hikari danio, a species of danio fish in Burma
Hikari Sentai Maskman, the 11th entry of the Sentai Series
Hikari (train), a train service running on the Tōkaidō/Sanyō Shinkansen in Japan
Nakajima Hikari, a family of radial aircraft engines